Mexipyrgus is a genus of very small freshwater snails, aquatic gastropod mollusks in the family Cochliopidae.

Species
Species within the genus Mexipyrgus include:
Mexipyrgus carranzae Taylor, 1966
Species brought into synonymy
Mexipyrgus churinceanus Taylor, 1966: synonym of Mexipyrgus carranzae Taylor, 1966
Mexipyrgus escobedae Taylor, 1966: synonym of Mexipyrgus carranzae Taylor, 1966
Mexipyrgus lugoi Taylor, 1966: synonym of Mexipyrgus carranzae Taylor, 1966
Mexipyrgus mojarralis Taylor, 1966: synonym of Mexipyrgus carranzae Taylor, 1966
Mexipyrgus multilineatus Taylor, 1966: synonym of Mexipyrgus carranzae Taylor, 1966

References

 Nomenclator Zoologicus info

Cochliopidae